Soundtrack is a CD released by the Fullerton College Jazz Bands and Vocal Jazz for the Discovery Records Trend AM-PM label.

Background 
In 1981 the Music Department at Fullerton College built a 16 track in house recording facility which was to serve as a teaching tool for both student music groups and students wanting to take recording technology classes at a vocational level.  Soundtrack is the sixth of several albums to come out of this studio to feature the award-winning Fullerton College Jazz Band.  The CD contains tracks from two of the Fullerton College jazz groups: Jazz Band I and Vocal Jazz. The #1 jazz band was the winner of the 1985 International Association for Jazz Education Disneyworld Competition and the opening band for the 1985 Playboy Jazz Festival and the LP/CD recordings to date are recipients of numerous Down Beat and NARAS Awards.
 
Albert Marx, who was the owner of Discovery Records/Trend Records AM-PM label, became very impressed with the band four years earlier and the level of the music coming from the jazz groups at Fullerton College.   He decided to support the younger, up and coming jazz students/players from the greater Los Angeles/Southern California region by producing certain LPs and CDs.

Track listing

Recording Sessions 

 Recorded January 1987 and 1988 Fullerton College, Fullerton, California

Personnel

Musicians 
Conductors: James Linahon and Brent Pierce
Sax (guest soloists): Ernie Del Fante, Lanny Morgan
Trumpet (guest soloist): James Linahon
Vocal (guest soloist): Sunny Wilkenson
Piano (guest soloists): Rick Helzer, Tom Ranier
Guitar (guest soloists): Tom Hynes, Adrian Rosen
Drums (guest soloist): Allen Carter
Saxes and woodwinds:  Tuan Vu, Yancey Valdez, Dino Soldo, Russell Shepherd, Ed Little, Mike Thomas, Steve Slate, Rob Mader
Trumpets and flugelhorns: Paul Pugh, David Glenday, Glen Colby, Tammy Dauba, Dave Allen
Trombones: Ryan Anglin, Bruce Lansford, Glen Goodrich, Steve Sowicki, Alphonse Mosse III, Kurt Godel
Guitar: John Hancock
Piano: Shawn Whitmer
Bass: Dave Carpenter, Tom Fowler
Drums: Eugean Ermel, Bryan Head, Rich Arbuckle
Vocal Jazz: Patricia Figeroa, Dorraine Metzger, Janis Swanson, Dana Lynn Gribble, Kerstin Klopsch, Doug Eash, Mark Henson, Harlan Harris, Ed McCormick, Seth Weiss, Bruce Hart

Production 
Recording, mixing, re-mixing: James Linahon, Warren Hatfield, Randy Beers, Dan Friedman
Mastering: Robert Vosgien, CMS Digital
Album cover design: Michele Shih
Album art director: Graham Booth, Fullerton College Art Department

Reception 
"...vocal director Brent Pierce handles the FC Vocal Jazz ensemble with skill and the featured faculty vocalist Sunny Wilkenson is a soulful singer whose phrasing is slightly reminiscent of Stevie Wonder. Soundtrack is a digital recording and the engineering is top flight...Some of the student soloists who impress include David Allen, Aiphonse Mosse and John Hancock. The faculty soloists also demonstrate a firm grasp of big band soloing. The ensemble passages benefit from crisp execution and the arrangements reveal hard work and rehearsal. A blind-folded listener would probably have difficulty distinguishing between Soundtrack and the work of any number of contemporary (professional big band CDs)..."

Cadence Magazine

References

External links

 Official website

1990 albums
Fullerton College Jazz Band albums